Extermination through labour (or "extermination through work") is a term that was adopted to describe forced labor in Nazi concentration camps in light of the high mortality rate and poor conditions; in some camps a majority of prisoners died within a few months. In the 21st century, research has questioned whether there was a general policy of extermination through labor in the Nazi concentration camp system because of widely varying conditions between camps. German historian Jens-Christian Wagner argues that the camp system involved the exploitation of forced labor of some prisoners and the systematic murder of others, especially Jews, with only limited overlap between these two groups.

Some writers, notably Aleksandr Solzhenitsyn, have written that the Soviet Gulag system was also a form of extermination through labour. Similar statements have been made about the Laogai system under Mao Zedong's China.

Terminology
The term "extermination through labour" (Vernichtung durch Arbeit) was not generally used by the Nazi SS. However, it was specifically employed by Joseph Goebbels and Otto Georg Thierack in late 1942 negotiations involving them, Albert Bormann, and Heinrich Himmler, relating to the transfer of prisoners to concentration camps. The phrase was used again during the post-war Nuremberg trials.

In the 1980s and 1990s, historians began debating the appropriate use of the term. Falk Pingel believed the phrase should not be applied to all Nazi prisoners, while Hermann Kaienburg and Miroslav Kárný believed "extermination through labour" was a consistent goal of the SS. More recently, Jens-Christian Wagner has also argued that not all Nazi prisoners were targeted with annihilation. Wagner states, "As a metaphor for moral indignation, the use of the term ‘annihilation through labour’ by historians may be completely understandable; but it is not particularly helpful in an analytical sense, since it implies an ideological programme and, in doing so, disregards the impetus of contingent factors which emerged in the course of the war."

In Nazi Germany

The Nazis persecuted many individuals because of their race, political affiliation, disability, religion, or sexual orientation. Groups marginalized by the majority population in Germany included welfare-dependent families with many children, alleged vagrants and transients, as well as members of perceived problem groups, such as alcoholics and prostitutes. While these people were considered "German-blooded", they were also categorized as "social misfits" (Asoziale) as well as superfluous "ballast-lives" (Ballastexistenzen). They were recorded in lists (as were homosexuals) by civil and police authorities and subjected to myriad state restrictions and repressive actions, which included forced sterilization and ultimately imprisonment in concentration camps. Anyone who openly opposed the Nazi regime (such as communists, social democrats, democrats, and conscientious objectors) was detained in prison camps. Many of them did not survive the ordeal.

While others could possibly redeem themselves in the eyes of the Nazis, Germany encouraged and supported emigration of Jews to Palestine and elsewhere from 1933 until 1941 with arrangements such as the Haavara Agreement, or the Madagascar Plan. During the war in 1942, the Nazi leadership gathered to discuss what had come to be called "the final solution to the Jewish question" at a conference in Wannsee, Germany. The transcript of this gathering gives historians insight into the thinking of the Nazi leadership as they devised the details of the Jews' future destruction, including using extermination through labour as one component of their so-called "Final Solution".

In Nazi camps, "extermination through labour" was principally carried out through what was characterized at the Nuremberg Trials as "slave work" and "slave workers", in contrast with the forced labour of foreign work forces.

Working conditions included no remuneration of any kind, constant surveillance, physically demanding labour (for example, road construction, farm work, and factory work, particularly in the arms industry), excessive working hours (often 10 to 12 hours per day), minimal nutrition, food rationing, lack of hygiene, poor medical care and ensuing disease, and insufficient clothing (for example, summer clothes even in the winter).

Torture and physical abuse were also used. Torstehen ("door standing") forced victims to stand outside naked with arms raised. When they collapsed or passed out, they would be beaten until they re-assumed the position. Pfahlhängen ("post attachment") involved tying the inmate's hands behind their back and then hanging them by their hands from a tall stake. This would dislocate and disjoint the arms, and the pressure would be fatal within hours. (Cf. strappado.)

Concentration camps

All aspects of camp life — the admission and registration of the new prisoners, the forced labour, the prisoner housing, the roll calls — were accompanied by humiliation and harassment.

Admission, registration and interrogation of the detainees was accompanied by scornful remarks from SS officials. The prisoners were stepped on and beaten during roll call. Forced labour partly consisted of pointless tasks and heavy labour, which aimed to wear down the prisoners.

Many of the concentration camps channeled forced labour to benefit the German war machine. In these cases the SS saw excessive working hours as a means of maximizing output. Oswald Pohl, the leader of the SS-Wirtschafts-Verwaltungshauptamt ("SS Economy and Administration Main Bureau", or SS-WVHA), who oversaw the employment of forced labour at the concentration camps, ordered on April 30, 1942:

Up to 25,000 of the 35,000 prisoners appointed to work for IG Farben in Auschwitz died. The average life-expectancy of a slave laborer on a work assignment amounted to less than four months. The emaciated forced-labourers died from exhaustion or disease or they were deemed to be incapable of work and murdered. About 30 percent of the forced labourers who were assigned to dig tunnels, which were constructed for weapon factories in the last months of the war, died. In the satellite camps, which were established in the vicinity of mines and industrial firms, even higher death-rates occurred, since accommodations and supplies were often even less adequate there than in the main camps.

In the Soviet Union 

The Soviet Gulag is sometimes presented as a system of death camps, particularly in post-Communist Eastern European politics. This controversial position has been criticized, considering that with the exception of the war years, a very large majority of people who entered the Gulag left alive. Alexander Solzhenitsyn introduced the expression camps of extermination by labour in his non-fiction work The Gulag Archipelago. According to him, the system eradicated opponents by forcing them to work as prisoners on big state-run projects (for example the White Sea-Baltic Canal, quarries, remote railroads and urban development projects) under inhumane conditions. Political writer Roy Medvedev wrote: "The penal system in the Kolyma and in the camps in the north was deliberately designed for the extermination of people." Soviet historian Alexander Nikolaevich Yakovlev expands upon this, stating that Stalin was the "architect of the gulag system for totally destroying human life".

Political theorist Hannah Arendt argued that although the Soviet government deemed them all "forced labor" camps, this in fact highlighted that the work in some of the camps was deliberately pointless, since "forced labor is the normal condition of all Russian workers, who have no freedom of movement and can be arbitrarily drafted for work at any place and at any time." She differentiated between "authentic" forced-labor camps, concentration camps, and "annihilation camps". In authentic labor camps, inmates worked in "relative freedom and are sentenced for limited periods." Concentration camps had extremely high mortality rates but were still "essentially organized for labor purposes." Annihilation camps were those where the inmates were "systematically wiped out through starvation and neglect." She criticizes other commentators' conclusion that the purpose of the camps was a supply of cheap labor. According to her, the Soviets were able to liquidate the camp system without serious economic consequences, showing that the camps were not an important source of labor and were overall economically irrelevant.

The only real economic purpose they typically served was financing the cost of supervision. Otherwise the work performed was generally useless, either by design or made that way through extremely poor planning and execution; some workers even preferred more difficult work if it was actually productive.

According to formerly secret internal Gulag documents, some 1.6 million people may have died in the period between 1935 and 1956 in Soviet forced labour camps and colonies (excluding prisoner-of-war camps). Some 900,000 of these deaths fall between 1941 and 1945, coinciding with the period of the German-Soviet War when food supply levels were low in the entire country.

These figures are consistent with the archived documents that Russian historian Oleg Khlevniuk presents and analyzes in his study The History of the Gulag: From Collectivization to the Great Terror, according to which some 500,000 people died in the camps and colonies from 1930 to 1941. Khlevniuk points out that these figures don't take into account any deaths that occurred during transport. Also excluded are those who died shortly after their release owing to the harsh treatment in the camps, who, according to both archives and memoirs, were numerous. The historian J. Otto Pohl states that 2,749,163 prisoners perished in the labour camps, colonies and special settlements, while stressing that this is an incomplete figure.

In Maoist China 

Like the Soviet system, Mao Zedong's rule of China also included a forced labor prison system known as the Laogai or "reform through labour". According to Jean-Louis Margolin during the Campaign to Suppress Counterrevolutionaries, the harshness of the official prison system reached unprecedented levels, and the mortality rate until 1952 was "certainly in excess" of 5 percent per year, and reached 50 percent during six months in Guangxi. In Shanxi, more than 300 people died per day in one mine. Torture was commonplace and the suppression of revolts, which were quite numerous, resulted in "veritable massacres".

In Mao: The Unknown Story, the Mao biographer Jung Chang and historian Jon Halliday estimate that perhaps 27 million people died in prisons and labor camps during Mao Zedong's rule. They have written that inmates were subjected to back-breaking labor in the most hostile wastelands, and that executions and suicides by any means were commonplace.

Writing in The Black Book of Communism, which describes the history of repressions by Communist states, Jean-Louis Margolin states that perhaps 20 million died in the prison system. Professor Rudolph Rummel puts the number of forced labor "democides" at 15,720,000, excluding "all those collectivized, ill-fed and clothed peasants who would be worked to death in the fields." Harry Wu puts the number of victims at 15 million.

See also
 Critique of work
 Death march
 Hunger Plan, a German plan to starve the Slavic and Jewish populations
 Jägerstab
 Labour Battalions (Ottoman Empire)
 Penal labour
 Utilitarian genocide

References

Further reading 
  Stéphane Courtois: Das Schwarzbuch des Kommunismus, Unterdrückung, Verbrechen und Terror. Piper, 1998. 987 pages. 
  Jörg Echternkamp: Die deutsche Kriegsgesellschaft: 1939 bis 1945: Halbband 1. Politisierung, Vernichtung, Überleben. Deutsche Verlags-Anstalt, Stuttgart 2004. 993 pages, graphic representation. 
 Oleg V. Khlevniuk: The History of the Gulag: From Collectivization to the Great Terror New Haven: Yale University Press 2004, 
  A. I. Kokurin/N. V. Petrov (Ed.): GULAG (Glavnoe Upravlenie Lagerej): 1918–1960 (Rossija. XX vek. Dokumenty), Moskva: Materik 2000, 
  Joel Kotek/Pierre Rigoulot: Das Jahrhundert der Lager.Gefangenschaft, Zwangsarbeit, Vernichtung, Propyläen 2001, 
  Rudolf A. Mark (Ed.): Vernichtung durch Hunger: der Holodomor in der Ukraine und der UdSSR. Wissenschaftlicher Verlag Berlin, Berlin 2004. 207 pages 
 
 
 Anne-Kathleen Tillack-Graf (2014). Work during the Time of Nazi Germany: Work for Nazi Germany. In: Polkowska, Dominika (ed.). The Value of Work in Contemporary Society. Oxford, pp. 169-174. ISBN 978-1-84888-357-4.

External links 
  Lemo Die nationalsozialistischen Konzentrationslager
  Frauen im Gulag, Deutschlandradio, May 11, 2003

Crimes against humanity
Execution methods
Genocide
The Holocaust
Slavery